A Single History: 1991–1997 is a compilation album by Unwound released on Kill Rock Stars. It contains tracks previously released on various 7-inch singles and multiple-artist compilations.  "Crab Nebula" and "Stumbling Block" originally appeared on the band's 1991 demo tape.  The fourth song is a reference to the U.S. government's secret MKUltra brainwashing program.  The "Negated"/ "Said Serial"/ "Census" 7-inch was the first-ever release on Troubleman Unlimited Records.  "Plight" is a cover of a Minutemen song, from the tribute disc Our Band Could Be Your Life. "Seen Not Heard" is from a split 7-inch with Steel Pole Bath Tub; the song comes from the Repetition album sessions.  Following an extended drum and bass-style intro, "The Light At The End..." features odd vocal snippets from a man trying to persuade some band to make upbeat, "tribal-sounding" aerobics music.

According to a Kill Rock Stars Q&A from 1999, the cover art is a composite of photos taken by drummer Sara Lund on the band's overseas tours. The top photo is of St. Mark's Basilica in Venice; "the train in the middle is from Japan, and the nuns on the bottom are from a religious procession we witnessed in Trani, Italy."

Track listing
"Mile Me Deaf" – 2:20 (1997)
"Broken E-Strings" – 3:11 (1994)
"Totality" – 3:07 (1994)
"MKUltra" – 4:48 (1994)
"Seen Not Heard" – 3:41 (1996)
"Caterpillar" – 1:58 (1991)
"Miserific Condition" – 1:57 (1991)
"Everything Is Weird" – 2:52 (1996)
"Negated" – 4:36 (1994)
"Said Serial" – 2:23 (1994)
"Census" – 1:50 (1994)
"Plight" – 1:56 (1995)
"Stumbling Block" – 2:01 (1991)
"Eternalux" – 4:58 (1993)
"New Radio Hit" – 2:21 (1994)
"The Light at the End of the Tunnel Is a Train" – 10:10 (1997)
"Crab Nebula" – 4:06 (1991)

References

Unwound albums
1999 compilation albums
Kill Rock Stars compilation albums
Albums produced by Steve Fisk